Color photography is photography that uses media capable of capturing and reproducing colors. By contrast, black-and-white or gray-monochrome photography records only a single channel of luminance (brightness) and uses media capable only of showing shades of gray.

In color photography, electronic sensors or light-sensitive chemicals record color information at the time of exposure. This is usually done by analyzing the spectrum of colors into three channels of information, one dominated by red, another by green and the third by blue, in imitation of the way the normal human eye senses color. The recorded information is then used to reproduce the original colors by mixing various proportions of red, green and blue light (RGB color, used by video displays, digital projectors and some historical photographic processes), or by using dyes or pigments to remove various proportions of the red, green and blue which are present in white light (CMY color, used for prints on paper and transparencies on film).

Monochrome images which have been "colorized" by tinting selected areas by hand or mechanically or with the aid of a computer are "colored photographs", not "color photographs". Their colors are not dependent on the actual colors of the objects photographed and may be inaccurate.

The foundation of all practical color processes, the three-color method was first suggested in an 1855 paper by Scottish physicist James Clerk Maxwell, with the first color photograph produced by Thomas Sutton for a Maxwell lecture in 1861.  Color photography has been the dominant form of photography since the 1970s, with monochrome photography mostly relegated to niche markets such as art photography.

History

Three-color processes
The three-color method, which is the foundation of virtually all practical color processes whether chemical or electronic, was first suggested in an 1855 paper on color vision by Scottish physicist James Clerk Maxwell.

In his studies of color vision, Maxwell showed, by using a rotating disk with which he could alter the proportions, that any visible hue or gray tone could be made by mixing only three pure colors of light – red, green and blue – in proportions that would stimulate the three types of cells to the same degrees under particular lighting conditions.  To emphasize that each type of cell by itself did not actually see color but was simply more or less stimulated, he drew an analogy to black-and-white photography: if three colorless photographs of the same scene were taken through red, green and blue filters, and transparencies ("slides") made from them were projected through the same filters and superimposed on a screen, the result would be an image reproducing not only red, green and blue, but all of the colors in the original scene.

The first color photograph made according to Maxwell's prescription, a set of three monochrome "color separations", was taken by Thomas Sutton in 1861 for use in illustrating a lecture on color by Maxwell, where it was shown in color by the triple projection method. The test subject was a bow made of ribbon with stripes of various colors, apparently including red and green. During the lecture, which was about physics and physiology, not photography, Maxwell commented on the inadequacy of the results and the need for a photographic material more sensitive to red and green light. A century later, historians were mystified by the reproduction of any red at all, because the photographic process used by Sutton was for all practical purposes totally insensitive to red light and only marginally sensitive to green. In 1961, researchers found that many red dyes also reflect ultraviolet light, coincidentally transmitted by Sutton's red filter, and surmised that the three images were probably due to ultra-violet, blue-green and blue wavelengths, rather than to red, green and blue.

Screen-plate era

The simpler and somewhat more economical alternative was the Joly screen process. This required no special camera or viewer, just a special color-compensating filter for the camera lens and a special holder for the photographic plates. The holder contained the heart of the system: a clear glass plate on which very fine lines of three colors had been ruled in a regular repeating pattern, completely covering its surface. The idea was that instead of taking three separate complete photographs through three colored filters, the filters could be in the form of a large number of very narrow strips (the colored lines) allowing the necessary color information to be recorded in a single compound image. After the negative was developed, a positive transparency was printed from it and a viewing screen with red, green and blue lines in the same pattern as the lines of the taking screen was applied and carefully aligned. The colors then appeared as if by magic. The transparency and screen were very like the layer of monochrome liquid crystal elements and overlay of hair-thin red, green and blue color filter stripes which create the color image in a typical LCD display. This was the invention of Irish scientist John Joly, although he, like so many other inventors, eventually discovered that his basic concept had been anticipated in Louis Ducos du Hauron's long-since-expired 1868 patent.

Digital photography

Artists' perspectives
Photographers differed in opinion about color photography when it was introduced. Some fully embraced it when it was available to the public in the late 1930s, while others remained skeptical of its relevance in the art of photography.

Proponents
Paul Outerbridge was an American photographer prominent for his early use and experiments in color photography. He began writing a monthly column on color photography for the U.S. Camera Magazine around 1930. Outerbridge became known for the high quality of his color illustrations, made by an extremely complex tri-color carbro process. In 1940 he published his seminal book Photographing in Color, using high quality illustrations to explain his techniques.

Ferenc Berko, a classic photographer who lived during the rise of color film, was one of the photographers who immediately recognized the potential of color film. He saw it as a new way to frame the world; a way to experiment with the subjects he photographed and how he conveyed emotion in the photograph.

John Hedgecoe, another photographer who lived during this time period, was another example of those who preferred color. He published a book entitled The Art of Color Photography, in which he explained the importance of understanding the "special and often subtle relationships between different colors". He also described the psychological and emotional power that color can have on the viewer, since certain colors, he argues, can make people feel a certain way.

Skeptics
According to Eggleston, his former idol, Henri Cartier-Bresson, said to him at a party, “William, color is bullshit”, and then not another word.

Harold Baquet, for instance—a relatively current photographer known best for documenting New Orleans civil rights—was not keen on color. He preferred to take pictures mainly using black-and-white film. When asked about his reasoning for this preference during an interview, he replied “The less is more thing. Sometimes the color distracts from the essential subject. Sometimes, just light, line and form is enough, and it allows you to explore the sculptural qualities of that third dimension, that illusional dimension of depth. And it’s fun”. This aversion to color was due mainly to a fear of losing simplicity in his pictures. He worried that color gave the eye too much to take in.

See also
People
 

Other topics

Notes

References

General references
 Coe, Brian (1978). Colour Photography: the first hundred years 1840–1940. Ash & Grant.
 Coote, Jack (1993). The Illustrated History of Colour Photography. Fountain Press Ltd., .
 Preservation of Photographs. Kodak publication, no. F-30. (1979). Rochester, NY: Eastman Kodak Co.
 Paine, C. (1996). Standards in the Museum Care of Photographic Collections. London, UK: Museums & Galleries Commission. .
 Keefe, L.E.; & Inch, D. (1990). The Life of a Photograph: Archival processing, matting, framing, storage. Boston, MA: Focal Press. , .
 Lavédrine, B.; Gandolfo, J.-P.; Monod, S. (2003). A Guide to the Preventive Conservation of Photograph Collections. Los Angeles, CA: Getty Conservation Institute. , .
 Photograph Preservation and the Research Library. (1991). Mountain View, CA: The Research Libraries Group. .
 Penichon, Sylvie (2013). Twentieth-Century Color Photographs: Identification and Care. Los Angeles, CA: Getty Publications. .
 Reilly, J.M.; et al. (1998). Storage Guide for Color Photographic Materials. Albany, NY: University of the State of New York.
 Ritzenthaler, M.L.; Vogt-O'Connor, D. (2006). Photographs: Archival care and management. Chicago, IL: Society of American Archivists. , .
 Sipley, Louis Walton. (1951). A Half Century of Color, New York, NY: Macmillan.
 Caring for Photographs: Display, storage, restoration. Life library of photography. (1982). Alexandria, VA: Time-Life Books. .
 Weinstein, R.A.; Booth, L. (1977). Collection, Use, and Care of Historical Photographs. Nashville, TN: American Association for State and Local History. .
 Wilhelm, H.G.; Brower, C. (1993). The Permanence and Care of Color Photographs: Traditional and digital color prints, color negatives, slides, and motion pictures. Grinnell, IA: Preservation Pub. Co. .
 Wythe, D. (2004). Museum Archives: An introduction. Chicago, IL: Society of American Archivists. , .

Further reading

Mathew Carey Lea in 1887 article appearing in Scientific American entitled "Photography in Natural Colors".

 
Photography
Scottish inventions